Panagia is a small uninhabited Greek island off the coast of Paxoi, the lesser of the Ionian Islands. It lies 200 m off the east coast of Paxoi, close to the main town Gaios.

External links
Panagia on GTP Travel Pages (in English and Greek)

Islands of the Ionian Islands (region)
Uninhabited islands of Greece
Islands of Greece
Landforms of Corfu (regional unit)
Populated places in Corfu (regional unit)